The 2020–21 season is Bangkok United Football Club's 12th in the new era since they took over from Bangkok University Football Club in 2009. It is the 5th season in the Thai League and the club's 10th (8th consecutive) season in the top flight of the Thai football league system since returning in the 2013 season.

In the league, match 5–30 are postponed following the coronavirus outbreak.

Squad

Transfer

Pre-season transfer

In

Out

Retained

Return from loan

Mid-season transfer

In

Out 

Note 1: Bonilla will join Port on an initial loan deal, which will become a permanent transfer when his contract with Bangkok United is up in 31/12/2020.

Friendlies

Pre-Season Friendly

2020 Asia Cup

Mid-Season Friendly

Competitions

Overview

Thai League

League table

Results summary

Results by matchday

Matches

FA Cup

Statistics

Appearances and goals

|-
! colspan="16" style="background:#DCDCDC; text-align:center;"| Goalkeepers

|-
! colspan="16" style="background:#DCDCDC; text-align:center;"| Defenders

|-
! colspan="16" style="background:#DCDCDC; text-align:center;"| Midfielders

|-
! colspan="16" style="background:#DCDCDC; text-align:center;"| Forwards

|-
! colspan="16" style="background:#dcdcdc; text-align:center"| Players transferred out during the season

Top scorers
{| class="wikitable" style="text-align:center;width:75%;"
|-
! Rank
! No.
! Pos.
! Player
! Thai League
! FA Cup
! Total
|-
| 1
| 14
| FW
|align=left|  Nattawut Suksum
||12||2||14
|-
| 2
| 37 
| FW
|align=left|  Heberty
||9||1||10
|-
| 3
| 10
| FW
|align=left|  Vander Luiz
||7||0||7
|- 
| rowspan="2"| 4
| 20
| FW
|align=left|  Chananan Pombuppha
||2||4||6
|-
| 11
| MF
|align=left|  Anon Amornlerdsak
||4||2||6
|-
| 5
| 38
| FW
|align=left|  Brenner Marlos
||3||2||5
|-
| 6
| 28
| MF
|align=left|  Thossawat Limwannasathian
||4||0||4
|-
|rowspan="3"| 7  
| 39
| MF
|align=left|  Pokklaw Anan
||3||0||3
|-
| 3
| DF
|align=left|  Everton
||3||0||3
|-
| 4
| DF
|align=left|  Manuel Bihr
||3||0||3
|-
|rowspan="3"| 8 
| 29
| MF
|align=left|  Sanrawat Dechmitr
||2||0||2
|-
| 28
| MF
|align=left|  Rungrath Poomchantuek
||0||2||2
|-
| 5
| DF
|align=left|  Putthinan Wannasri
||2||0||2
|-
|rowspan="5"| 9
| 7
| MF
|align=left|  Hajime Hosogai
||1||0||1
|-
| 21
| MF
|align=left|  Chayathorn Tapsuvanavon
||0||1||1
|-
| 19
| DF
|align=left|  Tristan Do
||1||0||1
|-
| 26
| DF
|align=left|  Peerapat Notchaiya
||0||1||1
|-
| 16
| DF
|align=left|  Mika Chunuonsee
||0||1||1
|-
|- class="sortbottom"
|colspan="4"|Own goals
|1
|0
|1
|-
! colspan="4"|Total
!57
!17
!74
|-

Top assist
{| class="wikitable" style="text-align:center;width:75%;"
|-
! Rank
! No.
! Pos.
! Player
! Thai League
! FA Cup
! Total
|-
| 1
| 8
| MF
|align=left|  Vander Luiz
||13||2||15
|-
| 2
| 19
| MF
|align=left|  Tristan Do
||6||0||6
|-
| 3
| 39
| MF
|align=left|  Pokklaw Anan 
||3||1||4
|-
|rowspan="3"| 4
| 29
| MF
|align=left|  Sanrawat Dechmitr
||1||2||3
|-
| 11
| MF
|align=left|  Anon Amornlerdsak
||2||1||3
|-
| 26
| DF
|align=left|  Peerapat Notchaiya 
||3||0||3
|-
|rowspan="5"| 5
| 33
| MF
|align=left|  Jirayu Niamthaisong
||0||2||2
|-
| 17
| MF
|align=left|  Rungrath Poomchantuek
||0||2||2
|-
| 3
| DF
|align=left|  Everton
||1||1||2
|-
| 24
| DF
|align=left|  Wanchai Jarunongkran 
||2||0||2
|-
| 8
| MF
|align=left|  Wisarut Imura 
||2||0||2
|-
| rowspan="7"| 6
| 38
| FW
|align=left|  Brenner Marlos 
||1||0||1
|-
| 20
| FW
|align=left|  Chananan Pombuppha 
||0||1||1
|-
| 5
| DF
|align=left|  Putthinan Wannasri 
||1||0||1
|-
| 14
| FW
|align=left|  Nattawut Suksum 
||1||0||1
|-
| 37
| FW
|align=left|  Heberty Fernandes 
||1||0||1
|-
| 16
| DF
|align=left|  Mika Chunuonsee 
||1||0||1
|-
| 11
| MF
|align=left|  Anon Amornlerdsak 
||0||1||1
|-
! colspan="4"|Total
!38
!13
!51
|-

Clean sheets
{| class="wikitable" style="text-align:center;width:75%;"
|-
! Rank
! No.
! Pos.
! Player
! Thai League
! FA Cup
! Total
|-
| 1
| 1
| GK
|align=left|  Michael Falkesgaard
||5||1||6
|-
| 2
| 34
| GK
|align=left|  Warut Mekmusik
||1||0||1
|-
! colspan="4"|Total
!6
!1
!7
|-

Disciplinary record

Award

Monthly awards

Notes

References

BKU
Bangkok United F.C. seasons